Casa de Estudillo was a 19th-century adobe house, located in San Leandro, California. It was built by Don José Joaquín Estudillo, a member of the prominent Estudillo family of California.

History

It was built around 1850, and was the last home of José Joaquín Estudillo, a member of the prominent Estudillo family of California, and his wife Juana Martínez de Estudillo. 

The site is now the location of St Leander's Church. There is a plaque commemorating the house.

Landmark
The site of Casa de Estudillo is a California Historical Landmark.

See also
California Historical Landmarks in Alameda County, California

References

Adobe buildings and structures in California
Houses in Alameda County, California
1850 establishments in California
California Historical Landmarks
History of San Leandro, California
Houses completed in 1850